Proteuxoa flexirena is a moth of the family Noctuidae. It is found in Australia, including Tasmania.

The wingspan is about 40 mm.

References

Flexirena
Moths of Australia
Moths described in 1865